Yosheefin Shila Prasasti (born July 3, 1982 in Sleman) is an Indonesian sport shooter. At age twenty-two, Prasasti made her official debut at the 2004 Summer Olympics in Athens, where she placed twenty-second in the women's 10 m air rifle, with a score of 392 points, tying her position with four other athletes, including Finland's Marjo Yli-Kiikka.

At the 2008 Summer Olympics in Beijing, Prasasti competed for the second time in the women's 10 m air rifle after receiving a wild card slot. She placed twenty-fourth out of forty-seven shooters in the qualifying rounds of her event, with a slightly improved score of 393 points.

References

External links

NBC 2008 Olympics profile

Indonesian female sport shooters
Living people
Olympic shooters of Indonesia
Shooters at the 2004 Summer Olympics
Shooters at the 2008 Summer Olympics
1982 births
People from Sleman Regency
Sportspeople from Special Region of Yogyakarta
Southeast Asian Games bronze medalists for Indonesia
Southeast Asian Games medalists in shooting
Competitors at the 2007 Southeast Asian Games